is a video game compilation released exclusively for the PlayStation 3. It includes all of the mainline Metal Gear games directed and designed by Hideo Kojima that were released from 1987 through 2012. Bonus content include motion comic adaptations of the Metal Gear Solid graphic novels illustrated by Ashley Wood and a 100-page booklet that catalogs numerous promotional posters, brochures and advertisement related to the games in the compilation. It was released in the Americas on July 9, 2013, in Japan on July 11, 2013, in Europe on September 13, 2013, and in Australia on October 3, 2013.

Content
The Legacy Collection consists of two discs and a booklet. The first disc contains Metal Gear Solid 4, already updated with trophy support. The second disc is a dual-layered Blu-ray disc that contains the Metal Gear Solid HD Collection, plus motion comic versions of IDW's Metal Gear Solid graphic novels (which adapted the storylines of the first two Metal Gear Solid games with artwork by Ashley Wood). The motion comics were previously released in Japan as a two-disc DVD set in 2008 titled Metal Gear Solid 2: Bande Dessinée, but were not released in English until their inclusion in this set. The original Metal Gear Solid and its expansion are not included in either disc, but rather are downloaded from the PlayStation Store using voucher codes included in the set.

The Metal Gear Solid and Sons of Liberty motion comics were originally released in Japan as a two-disc DVD set in 2008 under the title of Metal Gear Solid 2: Bande Dessinée with Japanese voice acting. Although the English versions of both were not released until their inclusion in this set, the  credits also has a 2008 copyrights date. This, along with the involvement of Ryan Payton, suggests that the English voice acting were recorded in 2008.

Games
The included games are:

Videos
 Metal Gear Solid: Digital Graphic Novel
 Metal Gear Solid 2: Digital Graphic Novel

Booklet
 Metal Gear Solid: The Legacy

Reception
The compilation received high praise from critics, with the comprehensiveness of the collection being a central highlight. It scored a 93 out of 100 on Metacritic, indicating "universal acclaim".

Notes

References

External links

2013 video games
Action-adventure games
Bluepoint Games games
Konami video game compilations
Metal Gear video games
PlayStation 3 games
PlayStation 3-only games
Single-player video games
Stealth video games
Video games developed in Japan